The 2017 SEABA Under-16 Championship was the qualifying tournament for Southeast Asia Basketball Association at the 2017 FIBA Under-16 Asian Championship. The tournament was held in Quezon City, Philippines from May 14 to 18. The Smart Araneta Coliseum was the venue of the five-team competition, coinciding with the 2017 SEABA Championship.

The Philippines won their fourth straight title after winning all of their games in the tournament. Malaysia placed second while Thailand finished third. The top two teams will represent SEABA to the Asian tournament.

Venue

Results

Final standings

References 

2017
International basketball competitions hosted by the Philippines
2017–18 in Asian basketball
2017–18 in Philippine basketball
Sport in Quezon City
May 2017 sports events in Asia